The 2021–22 Chennai Senior Division, also known as 2021–22 Chennai Football League, was the 24th season of the Chennai Senior Division, the top-tier league in the Indian state Tamil Nadu. It is organised by Tamil Nadu Football Association (TNFA).

After a long habitus between TNFA and CFA, the 2022 season kicked off on 9 May 2022 with 10 teams competing for the title.

Regular season

 : *''Note : not to be confused with Indian Arrows

See also
 2021–22 season in state football leagues of India
 2021–22 Bangalore Super Division
 2021–22 Kerala Premier League

References

2021–22 in Indian football leagues
Football in Tamil Nadu